The Bronx Zoo (also historically the Bronx Zoological Park and the Bronx Zoological Gardens) is a zoo within Bronx Park in the Bronx, New York. It is one of the largest zoos in the United States by area and is the largest metropolitan zoo in the United States by area, comprising  of park lands and naturalistic habitats separated by the Bronx River. On average, the zoo has 2.15 million visitors each year . The zoo's original permanent buildings, known as Astor Court, were designed as a series of Beaux-Arts pavilions grouped around the large circular sea lion pool. The Rainey Memorial Gates were designed by sculptor Paul Manship in 1934 and listed on the National Register of Historic Places in 1972.

The zoo opened on November 8, 1899, featuring 843 animals in 22 exhibits. Its first director was William Temple Hornaday, who served as director for 30 years. From its inception the zoo has played a vital role in animal conservation. In 1905, the American Bison Society was created in an attempt to save the American bison from extinction, which had been depleted from tens-of-millions of animals to only a few hundred. Two years later they were successfully reintroduced into the wild. In 2007, the zoo successfully reintroduced three Chinese alligators into the wild. The breeding was a milestone in the zoo's 10-year effort to reintroduce the species to the Yangtze River in China.

Today, the Bronx Zoo is world-renowned for its large and diverse animal collection, and its award-winning exhibitions. The zoo is part of an integrated system of four zoos and one aquarium managed by the Wildlife Conservation Society (WCS), and it is accredited by the Association of Zoos and Aquariums (AZA).

History

Early years

In 1895, a group made up largely of members of the Boone and Crockett Club founded the New York Zoological Society (later renamed the Wildlife Conservation Society) for the purposes of founding a zoo, promoting the study of zoology, and preserving wildlife. Credit for this belonged chiefly to Club members Madison Grant and C. Grant LaFarge.

The zoo (sometimes called the Bronx Zoological Park and the Bronx Zoological Gardens) opened its doors to the public on November 8, 1899, featuring 843 animals in 22 exhibits. Its first director was William Temple Hornaday, who had 30 years of service at the zoo.

Heins & LaFarge designed the original permanent buildings, known as Astor Court, as a series of Beaux-Arts pavilions grouped around the large circular sea lion pool. In 1934, the Rainey Memorial Gates, designed by sculptor Paul Manship, were dedicated as a memorial to noted big game hunter Paul James Rainey. The gates were listed on the National Register of Historic Places in 1972.

The Rockefeller Fountain, which today adorns the gardens just inside the Fordham Road Gate, was once a landmark in Como, Italy. Originally built by Biagio Catella in 1872, it stood in the main square (Piazza Cavour) by the lakeside. Bought by William Rockefeller in 1902 for lire 3,500 (the estimated equivalent then of $637, and today of around $17,600), it was installed at the zoo in 1903. In 1968, the fountain was designated an official New York City landmark, and is one of the few local monuments to be honored in this way.

The New York Zoological Society's seal was designed by famed wildlife-artist Charles R. Knight. It depicted a ram's head and an eagle to reflect the society's interest in preserving North American wildlife. While no longer in use, the seal can still be found on the lawn in the center of Astor Court.

On December 17, 1902, the zoo became one of the seven zoos outside of Australia, and one of only two in the United States, to ever hold the now-extinct thylacine. The first was a male obtained from German animal dealer Carl Hagenbeck. It died on August 15, 1908. The zoo received a second male on January 26, 1912, from the Beaumaris Zoo in Tasmania, who later died on November 20 of that year. The zoo received its final two animals from Sydney animal dealer Ellis S. Joseph. The first was an unsexed individual who arrived on November 7, 1916, in poor condition and died seven days later. The second and final animal was a female purchased from the Beaumaris Zoo by Joseph for £25 (~$35) and then was resold to the zoo, arriving on July 14, 1917. On a visit, the director of the Melbourne Zoo, Mr. Le Souef, said upon seeing the animal:

The thylacine died on September 13, 1919.

In early 1903, the zoo was gifted a pair of Barbary lions, a subspecies which is extinct in the wild. The female was named Bedouin Maid and male Sultan, who went on to become one of the zoo's most popular animals. Displayed in the Lion House, Sultan was four years old at the time and described as being both "a perfect specimen" and "unusually good tempered". In May 1903, the pair produced three cubs, the first to be born at the zoo. On October 7, 1905, Charles R. Knight painted a portrait of Sultan and the animal went on to be the focus of many of the zoo's postcards. Sultan was also the model for the lion which sits atop the Rainey Memorial Gates.

In 1916, the zoo built the world's first animal hospital located at a zoo.

In 1926, the Bronx Zoo and the Smithsonian Institution's National Zoological Park simultaneously became the first in the country to exhibit shoebills.

The same year, W. Douglas Burden, F. J. Defosse, and Emmett Reid Dunn collected two live adult Komodo dragons—the first in America—for the zoo.

In 1937, the zoo became the first in North America to exhibit okapi.

Recent years

In 1960, the zoo became the first in the world to keep a James's flamingo, a species which had been thought to be extinct until 1957. They were imported along with the similar Andean flamingo.

The zoo was one of the few in the world to exhibit proboscis monkeys outside of Southeast Asia and, in the 1976 International Zoo Yearbook, the zoo reported having eight monkeys, seven of which were born at the zoo. As of March 1999, it only had two monkeys left, these two being the last members of their species kept in the United States. In 2003, the pair were sent to the Singapore Zoo.

On June 6, 1990, the zoo received a female Sumatran rhinoceros named Rapunzel. At the time, the zoo was one of only three in North America to hold the critically endangered species, with the Cincinnati and San Diego Zoos being the others, holding one female each. The three institutions were a part of the Sumatran Rhino Trust's plan to start a captive breeding program for the species. Rapunzel was born in the wild in Sumatra and rescued from an area of rainforest that was slated to be cleared for a palm oil plantation in 1989. Though it's believed she bred in the wild, she never produced any calves in captivity. It was eventually determined that she was past reproductive age, at which point she was returned to the zoo in 2000, having been brought out for breeding purposes. She lived in the Zoo Center until her death in December 2005 in her 30s.

In November 2006, the zoo opened up brand-new eco-friendly restrooms outside the Bronx River Gate. According to Clivus Multrum, which built the composting toilets chosen by the zoo, these facilities can serve 500,000 people and save  of water a year.

In March 2007, the Wildlife Conservation Society and the Fordham University Graduate School of Education announced they would offer a joint program leading to a Master of Science degree in education and New York State initial teacher certification in adolescent science education (biology, grades 7–12). The program began the next year, and is the first joint degree program of its kind.

In 2009, New York City cut funding for the state's 76 zoos, aquariums, and botanical gardens. The Wildlife Conservation Society as a whole suffered a $15-million deficit, and the zoo was forced to downsize its staff and animal collection. The budget cuts forced the buyouts of over 100 employees and layoffs of dozens more as well as the closure of four sections of the zoo: World of Darkness, Rare Animal Range, the Skyfari, and a small section of the overall still-open African Plains exhibit which featured endangered antelope. In the end, 186 staff positions (15%) were cut within the WCS. In 2012, Mayor Michael Bloomberg passed another budget cut that took $4.7-million from the funding of the zoo and the New York Aquarium, also run by the WCS. This cut represented more than half of what the collections were receiving. However, Bloomberg also passed an energy subsidy that brought the cuts down to $3.7-million.

In the summer of 2014, New York Representative Carolyn B. Maloney visited the Chengdu Panda Base in Sichuan, China and announced her plan to bring giant pandas to New York City. Initially, she aimed to exhibit them at the Central Park Zoo, though switched her attention to the Bronx after deciding the 6.5-acre zoo didn't have the resources to care for the animals. Maloney and her supporters, which included Maurice R. Greenberg, Newt Gingrich, and John A. Catsimatidis, were met with many obstacles throughout their campaign. Initially, the largest issues were the lack of support from Mayor Bill de Blasio and City Hall, and Chinese officials insisting that no more pandas be brought to the United States. However, in October 2015, Chinese Ambassador Cui Tiankai announced that his country was willing to enter preliminary talks with the city over the matter, and soon after de Blasio and City Hall signed a letter appealing to Chinese officials, drafted by Maloney in 2014. Despite her efforts, Maloney's campaign still has yet to overcome two critical steps in acquiring pandas: funding and the zoo's consent. Both de Blasio and the Wildlife Conservation Society refuse to fund the project, not wanting taxpayer or vital zoo money to go towards the highly expensive project. David Towne, chairman of the American-based Giant Panda Conservation Foundation, estimated that the cost of bringing pandas to the city would be around $50 million. The foundation has also said that the cost of keeping just one such animal is about $1 million a year, including food, trainers, and habitat upkeep. Additionally, China loans out their pandas for a hefty fee. A study published by The Washington Post in 2005 found that the four U.S. zoos holding pandas—the Memphis Zoo, the San Diego Zoo, the National Zoological Park (located in Washington, D.C, and Front Royal, Virginia) and Zoo Atlanta—had spent $33 million more on their animals than revenue made off of them between 2000 and 2003. Despite the figures, Maloney believes pandas in her city will do better since the city has a higher population than those four cities combined, and received a record-breaking 56.4-million visitors in 2014. Still, the WCS continues to steer away from bringing in these pandas. In 2014, a senior official from the WCS said Maloney's campaign had reached "a new level of absurdity" when it was announced she intended to bring a Chinese delegation to the Central Park Zoo. In November 2015, Jim Breheny, WCS Executive Vice President and Bronx Zoo Director, released a statement saying:

Exhibits and attractions

The zoo has two types of displays: free exhibits accessible with a General Admission ticket, and premium exhibits which require additional fees.

Free exhibits and attractions

African Plains
American Bison
Aquatic Bird House and Sea Bird Aviary

Big Bears
Birds of Prey
Bison Range
Bug Carousel
Carter Giraffe Building
Congo Gorilla Forest (during winter)
Gelada Reserve
Himalayan Highlands
JungleWorld
Madagascar!
Mitsubishi Riverwalk
Mouse House
Nature Trek
Northern Ponds
Pheasant Aviary
Sea Lion Pool
Tiger Mountain
World of Birds
World of Reptiles
Zoo Center

, the Bronx Zoo is home to more than 4,000 animals of 650 species, many of which are endangered or threatened. Some of its exhibits, such as World of Birds and World of Reptiles, are arranged by taxonomy, while others, such as African Plains and the Wild Asian Monorail, are arranged geographically.

Astor Court
Astor Court is an old section of the zoo that is home to many of the zoo's original buildings, designed by Heins & LaFarge. While most of the buildings are closed to the public, the former Lion House was reopened as the "Madagascar!" exhibit in 2008, and the Zoo Center still exhibits various species. The highlight of the area is the historic sea lion pool featuring California sea lions. Small aviaries featuring small bird species can be found nearby and white-headed capuchins can be seen behind the old Monkey House.

The New York City Landmarks Preservation Commission designated Astor Court's buildings as a city landmark in 2000, after a failed attempt to do so in 1966.

African Plains
African Plains allows visitors to walk past lions, African wild dogs, and Grévy's zebras, and see herds of nyalas, and slender-horned gazelles sharing their home with grey crowned cranes and hybrid giraffes (Baringo × reticulated giraffe). The exhibit originally opened in 1941 and was the first in the country to allow visitors to view predators and their prey in a naturalistic setting as well as allowing large predators such as lions to be exhibited cage-free. This success was achieved through the creation of a series of deep moats, a set-up which can still be found at the zoo today. The wild dogs, however, can be viewed close-up from a glass-fronted viewing pavilion. The zoo has bred their lions on multiple occasions, including one male and two females born in January 2010 and three males and one female born in August 2013. The zoo, in partnership with the NY Daily News, held a contest to name the 2010 cubs, which made their public debut in April 2010. The winning names were Shani, Nala, and Adamma. The 2013 cubs were named Thulani, Ime, Bahata, and Amara and the three males can still be found on-exhibit at the zoo. The Carter Giraffe Building, a section of African Plains, features indoor/outdoor viewing of the zoo's giraffes and South African ostriches, and is also home to spotted hyenas, common dwarf mongooses and southern white-faced owls. In June 2009, two aardvarks imported from Tanzania joined the exhibit. In September 2010, the pair gave birth to a male named Hoover, the first to ever be born at the zoo.

Until 2009, the southwestern corner of African Plains was home to the endangered Arabian oryx and blesbok. Due to budget cuts and the unpopularity of the species with visitors, they were phased-out of the collection. This section of the exhibit remains empty. In 2017 they received two baby cheetahs from the San Diego Zoo. Cheetahs are now part of their animal encounter programs. They were replaced by the hyenas.

Big Bears
Big Bears features four bears, a male grizzly bear and three ABC Islands bears rescued as orphans from Baranof Island of Alaska.

Until 2015, two female grizzly bears named Betty and Veronica also lived in this exhibit, but moved to the Central Park Zoo where they died in 2020 and 2021.

The zoo also formerly housed polar bears until the last individual, a 26 year old male named Tundra died in December 2017. Three dholes from the San Diego Zoo Safari Park were added to the habitat in 2019.

Gelada Reserve
Gelada Reserve, originally called Baboon Reserve, opened in 1990. It is a two-acre recreation of the Ethiopian highlands which, at the time of its opening, was the largest primate exhibit in the United States. The exhibit's main features revolve around the zoo's troop of geladas such as artificial rocks and earthbanks, and displays about life in the highlands and the side-by-side evolution of humans and geladas. Visitors can watch the geladas from multiple viewpoints along with Nubian ibex and rock hyrax, all of which are mixed together in the hilly enclosure. An African village-styled café overlooks the exhibit. Baboon Reserve won the AZA Exhibit Award in 1991. In the fall of 2014, a male gelada was born at the zoo, the first in over 13 years.

Himalayan Highlands
Himalayan Highlands, which opened on June 27, 1986, recreates the Himalayas region of Asia. The exhibit is known for its highly naturalistic look and use of the hilly and rocky terrain found in that portion of the zoo. The stars of the exhibit are the zoo's multiple snow leopards. The exhibit also is home to red pandas and white-naped cranes. In 2006, the zoo brought in a male snow leopard named Leo from Pakistan after he was orphaned at around two months old. Leo sired a male cub on April 9, 2013. The cub is one of more than 70 snow leopards born at the zoo, which was the first U.S. zoo to exhibit the species in 1903. Leo later became a grandfather when his son sired a female cub in 2017.

Madagascar!
Madagascar!, which opened on June 20, 2008, recreates various habitats found on the island of Madagascar and contains a variety of wildlife from the island, including lemurs, lesser hedgehog tenrecs, fossas, Nile crocodiles, radiated tortoises, greater vasa parrots and highly endangered cichlids. Ring-tailed lemurs, collared lemurs, red ruffed lemurs, crowned lemurs, and Coquerel's sifakas are the lemur species held in the exhibit. Madagascar! holds the first two ring-tailed mongoose in the United States and is home to over 100,000 Madagascar hissing cockroaches that can be named for $10 around Valentine's Day. The exhibit has multiple educational displays focusing on the many threats to the survival of these species as well as the WCS's conservation work in Madagascar. The building was converted from the former Lion House, which had opened in 1903 and closed by the late 1980s. The exhibit also has tomato frogs.

Mouse House
The Mouse House is a small building home to various species of small mammals, particularly rodents. The building features both diurnal and nocturnal areas and a row of outdoor cages which, during the summer months, are home to a variety of small primates, many of which are former monkey house inhabitants. Species include short-eared elephant shrews, eastern spiny mice, western spotted skunks, fennec foxes, Senegal bushbabies, Damaraland mole-rats and long-tailed chinchillas.

Aquatic Bird House
The current Aquatic Bird House opened on September 24, 1964, on the foundation of the original house, which was opened on November 8, 1899, with the rest of the zoo. The building features a multitude of mostly open-fronted enclosures mainly focusing on coastal and wetland habitats and the species that rely on them. Scarlet ibises, roseate spoonbills, anhingas, boat-billed herons and Madagascar crested ibises are among the residents here. The exhibit also features an outdoor pond home to a flock of American flamingos and a large aviary home to greater and lesser adjutants. The zoo is one of only three zoos in North America working with the endangered storks and has bred them several times, including the hatching of two chicks on June 27 and August 15, 2015. The Aquatic Bird House is also home to another endangered stork species: the Storm's stork. The zoo is one of only two in the United States working with this species; the other being the San Diego Zoo. In May 2014, the zoo opened a new nocturnal enclosure for a North Island brown kiwi in the building, and in May 2015, a colony of Australian little penguins from the Taronga Zoo were added.

Russell B. Aitken Sea Bird Aviary
The Russell B. Aitken Sea Bird Aviary, which opened on May 17, 1997, is a huge walk-through aviary designed to resemble the Patagonian coast. The aviary stands at 60-feet high, occupies 615,000 cubic feet, is supported by five steel arches, and netted with a stainless steel mesh. The aviary was built to replace the original De Jur Aviary that opened with the zoo in 1899 and collapsed in a snowstorm in February 1995. The exhibit's height and open space allows the residents to soar around above visitor's heads and the fake sea cliff walls allows for more natural nesting and roosting behavior. The aviary is home to about 100 birds, most being Inca terns, but also a small colony of Magellanic penguins, grey gulls, and brown pelicans. The aviary is also home to the last Guanay cormorant in captivity outside of South America. In April 2014, four Peruvian pelicans were added to the exhibit, and in January 2015, a pair of ruddy-headed geese were added.

Tiger Mountain
Tiger Mountain, which opened on May 15, 2003, is a three-acre exhibit which features Amur tigers and occasionally Malayan tigers, who are usually kept off-exhibit. The exhibit has two enclosures with glass viewing, the second of which has a 10,000 gallon pool with underwater viewing. Outside of the tigers, the exhibit has multiple interactive displays designed to educate visitors on behavioral enrichment and on the zoo's/WCS' ex-situ and in-situ conservation. The exhibit won the AZA Exhibit Award in 2004. The zoo has had good breeding successful with both subspecies of tiger, having bred both in 2010. Another set of Siberian tiger cubs were born in 2012, and a pair of Malayan tiger cubs were born in 2016. A tiger called Nadia tested positive for COVID-19 during the COVID-19 pandemic in New York City. Across from the entrance to Tiger Mountain, a large herd of Père David's deer and a pair of whooper swans can be found.

World of Birds

World of Birds, which originally opened in 1972, is an indoor bird house spanning two floors and featuring several walk-through aviaries. The building closed for repairs and upgrades in the summer of 2010, and reopened the following year. The exhibit has multiple educational displays focusing on deforestation and the illegal wildlife trade and their affects on wild bird populations. The most prominent residents of the exhibit include the maleos, a pair of knobbed hornbills, Andean cock-of-the-rock, Nicobar pigeons, southern bald ibises, ocellated turkeys Cuban amazons and white-throated bee-eaters. Emus can be found in an outdoor yard. In mid-2009, the zoo's hand-reared pair of great blue turacos successfully raised chicks, the first known instance of a hand-reared pair doing so. In March 2013, three maleo chicks hatched at the zoo, bringing their total number of birds to 12. The zoo, along with the WCS, works toward preserving this species in the wild as well.

World of Reptiles
World of Reptiles has been an attraction at the zoo since it first opened. The building's first curator was Raymond Lee Ditmars, who had kept 45 snakes in his attic before being hired at the zoo. The exhibit is a long hall with various terrariums situated on both sides. The exhibit also features a nursery area, which exhibits newborn herptiles born at the zoo, as well as a window into the off-show breeding and caring facilities. In the building, the zoo breeds and exhibits a wide range of species, including American alligators, blue iguanas, Cuban crocodiles, dyeing poison dart frogs, eyelash vipers, Fly River turtles, giant musk turtles, green anacondas, hellbenders, king cobras and Philippine sailfin lizards. The building also is home to the zoo's breeding population of Kihansi spray toads, which the zoo saved from extinction. On March 25, 2011, an Egyptian cobra escaped from its off-show enclosure, during which time the exhibit was closed to the public. Six days later, the animal was found elsewhere in the building. The zoo named the cobra MIA (Missing In Action) and placed it on exhibit.

Pheasant Aviary
The Pheasant Aviary is a long row of cages home to a large variety of bird species, particularly pheasants. Exhibited species include Elliot's pheasant, Lady Amherst's pheasant, Cabot's tragopan, blue eared-pheasant, mountain peacock-pheasant, Mérida helmeted curassow, Swinhoe's pheasant, Java peafowl, Indian peafowl, eastern loggerhead shrike (Lanius ludovicianus migrans), white-throated ground-dove, Lord Derby's parakeet, Montezuma oropendola and yellow-crested cockatoo.

Birds of Prey
Birds of Prey is a row of cages for multiple raptor species. The exhibit is home to bald eagles, golden eagles,  burrowing owls, snowy owls, an Andean condor, cinereous vultures and king vultures. In February 2011, the zoo received two bald eagles rescued in Wyoming. Nearby is a small pond for black-necked swans, American white pelicans and brown pelicans.

Zoo Center

The Zoo Center, built in 1908, is a one-story Beaux-Arts building located in Astor Court. The exhibit houses blue tree monitors, Mertens' water monitors and spiny-tailed monitors indoors and has both indoor and outdoor enclosures for Komodo dragons, Aldabra giant tortoises and southern white rhinoceros. The building's animal frieze was carved by A.P. Proctor. In 2000, the building was landmarked. The building is east of the Children's Zoo and south of Madagascar!.

The building was originally designed as the zoo's Elephant House and has held all three elephant species over its history. The building has also been home to various rhinoceros species, hippopotamus, Bactrian camel, Malayan tapir and North Sulawesi babirusa. The building also held Rapunzel, one of the few Sumatran rhinos held in U.S. zoos, until her death in 2005.

Bison Range
The Bison Range is in the northeast corner of the zoo, and has been a feature of the zoo since its opening. The range initially served to breed Plains bison, who were in danger of becoming extinct in the United States. Today, the exhibit continues to hold one of the few large herds of bison in U.S. zoos. In 1913, at the behest of the American Bison Society, fourteen bison were transported from the range to Montana's National Bison Range, as well as to Wind Cave National Park in South Dakota.

Northern Ponds
Northern Ponds is a series of naturalistic ponds home to a variety of waterfowl and other aquatic birds both wild and captive. Captive residents include black-necked cranes, red-breasted geese, lesser white-fronted geese, ruddy ducks, barnacle geese, mute swans and trumpeter swan. A wide variety of wild bird species can also be found in the ponds, including several native ducks such as mallards and mergansers, as well as other birds such as black-capped night-herons.

Mitsubishi Riverwalk
The Mitsubishi Riverwalk is a path that curves around the Bronx River, on the opposite bank from the zoo. It opened in 2004 upon the completion of a cleanup project on the river. The walkway was funded by Mitsubishi International Corporation Foundation and protects  of Bronx River watershed.

Paid exhibits and attractions
One admission to a premium exhibit costs between $12 to 14 per person per exhibit if paid separately. The fee for unlimited admission grants the ticket holder free access to all attractions for that day. Family memberships include full access.

There are nine premium exhibit attractions:
Bug Carousel
Butterfly Garden
Children's Zoo
Congo Gorilla Forest
JungleWorld
Wild Asia Monorail
Zoo Shuttle
Nature Trek

The Treetop Adventure Climb and Zipline requires a different fee and is not part of the admission fee online. Thus, it is not included in the park ticket or in any membership.

Bug Carousel
The Bug Carousel has seats shaped like insects. Installed in 2005, it has an annual ridership of 540,000 as of 2014.

Butterfly Garden
This permanent structure is an indoor butterfly conservatory which lets visitors walk through gardens and meadows and watch the butterflies up close.
 Built and inaugurated in mid-1996, the attraction is a 170-foot-long maze, where "visitors can walk through the stages of a monarch's metamorphosis" with a greenhouse in the middle hosting 44 species and over 1,000 butterflies; the greenhouse is really "a plastic tent on an aluminum frame". The structure, costing $500,000, is the precursor for a future permanent House of Invertebrates in the Monkey House near the Fordham Road entrance. Many species come from the New York metropolitan area, and all species of butterflies and moths are from around the continent.
If not successful, the Oklahoma City Zoo would have purchased it in September 1997.

Children's Zoo
The original Children's Zoo in the Bronx Zoo opened in 1941 with a nursery-rhyme theme; in 1981, a new Children's Zoo opened, and was instantly successful, seeing almost 250,000 visitors in two months. It closed for renovations in 2013; it reopened on May 30, 2015, with new exhibits featuring giant anteaters, pudús, Linne's two-toed sloth, American alligators, squirrel monkeys, Asian small-clawed otters, prairie dogs, fennec foxes, Nubian goats, zebus, alpacas, sheep, donkeys, chickens, ducks, pigs, geese and domestic turkeys.

Congo Gorilla Forest

In the southwestern part of the zoo, Congo Gorilla Forest is a  rainforest that is home to the 20 or so western lowland gorillas in the zoo. Angolan colobus, Wolf's guenons, pygmy marmosets and mandrills also call this area home. Visitors walk through the area and can also view it from treetop lookouts.

The Congo Gorilla Forest was opened in 1999 and was visited 7,000,000 times . In one of the largest breeding groups of western lowland gorillas in North America, the exhibit has two troops of gorillas, for a total of 19 gorillas. Since 1999, 14 gorillas, 23 red river hogs, 11 Wolf's guenons, and four okapis have been born in the exhibit. There is also an 8-minute film in the middle of the exhibit, as well as viewing points throughout. In total, there are about 400 animals from 55 species. Over $10.6 million for conservation of Central African habitats has been collected in donations since the exhibit's opening, and the exhibit has netted $12.5 million in exhibit fees .

JungleWorld

This exhibit is an indoor tropical jungle and home to nearly 800 species including Asian small-clawed otters, Javan lutungs, silvery lutungs, northern white-cheeked gibbons, Matschie's tree-kangaroos, gharials, Amur leopards, pygmy slow loris, greater mouse deer and Malayan tapirs, living in mangroves and on the beaches. Visitors can watch the gibbons swinging or singing and watch the otters play. The exhibit includes species that are usually on the jungle floor including stag beetles, scorpions and fire-bellied toads, but behind glass. A pond with a waterfall lets visitors sit and observe gourami and Fly River turtles.

Planning for JungleWorld, in the southeastern Wild Asia portion of the zoo, was started in 1977 and completed at a cost of $9.5 million in June 1985. $4.1 million in funds were donated by Enid A. Haupt, a member of the New York Zoological Society's board of trustees. The building's design integrates its environment with the path, as no bars are present in the building; the walkway has no full-height barriers and short railings; and only by means of ravines, streams, or cliffs are most of the animals separated from people and each other. There is a volcanic scrub forest, a mangrove swamp, a lowland evergreen rain forest with giant trees which merges into a mountain rain forest and five museum-like galleries connecting and explaining the habitats. The building was built to emphasize the fact that  of rainforest is lost every minute.

Wild Asia Monorail

The monorail was inaugurated in 1977 with the rest of the formerly underdeveloped Wild Asia section of the zoo. There are six 9-car monorails on this  ride, originally built by Rohr; the ride was refurbished in 2007. Some animals in the zoo can only be seen on this ride such as tigers, Przewalski's horse, Indian rhinoceros, Indian elephants, red pandas, and a plethora of even-toed ungulates such as axis deer, barasingha, Bactrian deer, blackbuck, gaurs, brow-antlered deer, babirusas, sambar deer, nilgai, red muntjacs, Indian hog deer, Formosan sika deer, tufted deer, Himalayan tahrs and markhors.

This ride takes visitors through a  area that recreates the mud wallows and pastures, forests and riverbanks of Asia. Visitors will see tigers, Indian elephants, rhinos and wild horses in their natural habitats. As the monorail travels along the Bronx River, visitors can see native animals including egrets, turtles, and ducks. The monorail is accessible for wheelchairs up to 26 inches (66 cm) wide. Smaller chairs are available at the monorail platform for visitors with wider wheelchairs or motorized scooters.

Nature Trek
Nature Trek opened on July 1, 2017, in the southeast portion of the park near Wild Asia. It consists of twelve covered rope bridges connecting small porches on the sides of towers. There are also elevated tunnels and a large overlook, as well as several small challenges resembling American Ninja Warrior obstacles. On the ground is a play area with a sandbox, water sprinklers and structures, and branches. Nature Trek is partially wheelchair-accessible and contains ramps of varying difficulties. This attraction discourages visitors who are wearing footwear such as flip-flops; high heels are prohibited. As part of a push for environmental sustainability, some parts of the attraction are made of black locust, and the structures use existing trees within the forest.

Bronx Zoo Treetop Adventure
The Treetop Adventure section opened on July 7, 2017, in the northeast portion of the park near Bronx River Parking. It consists of seven different levels of rope courses: two each of beginner, intermediate, and advanced, and one expert course. There is also a  zip-line course traversing  the Bronx River in both directions. The attraction also contains rope and swinging bridges, ladders and rolling and swinging objects. Separate from the rest of the zoo, it charges its own entry fee; the fee is only applied to those who are climbing on the objects or using the zip-line.

Dinosaur Safari
Dinosaur Safari takes visitors on a safari ride through a normally off-exhibit 2-acre wooded area and features animatronic dinosaurs from throughout time, starting at 300-million-years ago in the Permian Period and ending 235-million-years later in the Cretaceous Period. The ride lasts approximately 20 minutes. The "robo-saurs" are manufactured by Billings Productions, who lease them out to sites all over the world. The exhibit features more popular species such as the Triceratops and Brachiosaurus, as well as less well-known species such as the Pachycephalosaurus. The ride's Dilophosaurus spit water at visitors as a nod to the species' acid-spitting abilities in Steven Spielberg's Jurassic Park film and Michael Crichton's novel, even though there is no reason to believe the living animal did so. The exhibit originally ran through the summers of 2013 and 2014 and returned for the 2019 season.

Exhibits closed after the 1990s

World of Darkness
World of Darkness opened in 1969 and was the world's first major exhibit designed specifically to introduce the public to nocturnal animals such as the Chinese leopard cat (Prionailurus bengalensis chinensis), bay duiker, Pallas's long-tongued bat, spiny mouse, lesser mouse lemur, small spotted genet, lesser spear-nosed bats, spotted skunk, fat-tailed lemurs Jamaican fruit bat, Mohol bushbaby, cloud rat, Hoffman's two-toed sloth, rock cavy, pygmy slow loris, short-tailed bats, striped skunk, grey-legged night monkey, sand cat, Rodriguez flying fox, brush-tailed porcupine, broad-snouted caiman, sand boa and marine toad. Built by Morris Ketchum Jr. & Associates, the house was built where the zoo's Rocking Stone Restaurant stood until 1942. The exhibit used red-lights to dimly illuminate the enclosures within the windowless building. Like all nocturnal exhibits, the house ran on a reversed lighting schedule, which simulated night and day at opposite times to allow visitors to view nocturnal animals in a more naturalistic setting. Due to budget cuts and the high cost of running the exhibit, it was closed in 2009.

Rare Animal Range
Rare Animal Range was a trail which focused on highly endangered species. Featured species included guanaco, Formosan sika deer, pied ruffed lemurs and blue-eyed black lemurs. The exhibit also had duplicate enclosures for the zoo's Arabian oryx, blesbok, Père David's deer and broad-snouted caiman as well as a large pond with a pair of small islands in the center which were home to a pair of golden-cheeked gibbons. Due to budget cuts and the unpopularity of many of the species, the zoo was forced to close the exhibit in 2009.

While most of the species left the zoo when the exhibit closed, the Formosan sika deer were moved to the Wild Asia Monorail and the Père David's deer remained in their primary enclosure across from Tiger Mountain while the blue-eyed black lemurs were moved to Madagascar! where they are rotated with the Coquerel's sifakas. While no longer at the zoo, pied ruffed lemurs can still be seen at the zoo's partner institute, the Central Park Zoo. The zoo's popular Dinosaur Safari ran through a part of this area and the zoo's yearly Run for the Wild event runs through its entirety.

Skyfari
The Skyfari was a popular gondola lift which transported visitors from the Zoo Center to the Asian Plaza, running over African Plains and several other popular exhibits at the zoo. The seasonal exhibit ran from April to October and rose  feet in the air. With around 490,000 riders annually, the lift was the zoo's third most popular attraction after Congo Gorilla Forest and the Wild Asia Monorail. Despite its popularity, ticket sales for it were barely breaking-even and maintenance costs led to a loss of profit. On July 8, 2008, high winds and heat led to one of the cars derailing, which trapped thirty-six passengers for up to five hours. Due to this, along with heavy budget cuts, the ride was permanently closed in January 2009, after 35 years of operation.

Monkey House
The Monkey House, which first opened in 1901 and was originally named the Primate House, closed in late February 2012 after 111 years of operation. At the time of closing, it was home to cotton-top tamarins, white-faced sakis, Wied's marmosets, moustached tamarins, black-chinned emperor tamarins, Goeldi's monkeys and grey-handed night-monkeys, as well as Brazilian porcupines and Pallas's long-tongued bats. This was the building where Ota Benga spent most of his time during his stay at the zoo.

Some of the primates that were in the now-closed exhibit have been moved to other parts of the zoo, such as the cotton-top tamarins now being found in World of Birds; others were sent to other New York City zoos, such as the sakis being moved to the Central Park Zoo. White-headed capuchins can still be seen in an outdoor cage behind the building.

Amazing Amphibians
Amazing Amphibians was a short-lived exhibition which opened in the zoo's Zoo Center in June 2008 and only remained for a few years. The exhibit featured several educational displays on amphibian conservation as well as a few terrariums containing several amphibian species. Highlight species included Chacoan horned frog, Puerto Rican crested toad, smooth-sided toad and common mudpuppy.

While none of these species are currently on-exhibit at the zoo, the Puerto Rican crested toads can be seen at the Central Park Zoo, which breeds this species for reintroduction back into Puerto Rico.

4-D Theater
The 4-D Theater showed 4-D films with the help of 3-D film and built-in sensory effects, including moving seats, wind, mist, and scents. Produced by SimEx-Iwerks, the theater showed condensed versions of popular children's movies. The 4-D Theater previously showed Ice Age: Dawn of the Dinosaurs , one episode of Dora the Explorer, Rio and Storks. It closed in 2019.

WCS's Run for the Wild
In April 2008, the zoo hosted the first Run for the Wild event. The event is a 5k run ( long) organized by the Wildlife Conservation Society with the goal of raising money and awareness for their conservation programs of endangered species. Each year, there is a set entry fee for participants with varying prices depending on age; child (3–15), adult, and senior (65+). WCS Members get a discounted fee. Along with the entry fee, there is a $35 minimum donation per adult/senior participant. The event offers free prizes for donors, based on donation size, ranging from a Run for the Wild T-shirt to a special animal experience at the zoo. All donations are tax-deductible. All participants are also offered free all-day entry to the zoo and its paid exhibits/attractions. The yearly event takes place at the end of April and originally began at 8 am for those wishing to actually run, and 8:45 for those who wish to simply walk or jog; the start times were changed to 7 am and 7:45 am in later years.

The event takes participants through the zoo before opening hours, starting at the Bronx River Parkway Entrance, through the Asian Plaza and African Plains, and ending by the Rockefeller Fountain near Astor Court. The trail also takes runners through the now-closed section of the zoo where the Rare Animal Range once stood. Each year, the event focuses on a specific endangered species or animal group to help raise funds for: 2009's run was for gorillas, 2010 focused on tigers, 2011 helped raise funds to protect the Punta Tombo peninsula of Argentina for Magellanic penguins, 2012 focused on lions, both 2013 and 2014 focused on elephants, 2015 once again was for gorillas, and 2016's run will allow participants to run on behalf of their favorite animal.

In 2011, another WCS institute, the New York Aquarium, held its own Run for the Wild event for sea turtles in early October. The 5k run began at the aquarium and led down the Riegelmann Boardwalk on Coney Island. The aquarium held a second run the following year for walruses. The event has not returned to the aquarium since.

Conservation
In 1905, the zoo's first director, William T. Hornaday, along with President Theodore Roosevelt and other conservationists, created the American Bison Society (ABS) in an attempt to save the American bison from extinction. The bison had been depleted from tens-of-millions of animals to only a few hundred by the end of the 19th century due to westward expansion. The society worked to breed the species in captivity as well as raise public awareness, raise money to create protected reserves, and reintroduce bison back into the wild. On October 11, 1907, the first reintroduction of bison began when the zoo sent six males and nine females, by rail, to the Wichita Mountains Wildlife Refuge in Oklahoma. Seven days later, the animals were successfully reintroduced to the park. By 1935, the society, who had successfully carried out several more reintroductions from bison kept in zoos and ranches, considered their work done and disbanded that year. In 2005, the Wildlife Conservation Society resurrected and re-purposed the ABS to, "help build the social and scientific foundations for the ecological restoration of bison", and, "restore bison ecologically, not just animals in pens but actual functioning animals in the larger landscape", (Keith Aune, WCS bison coordinator). According to a study published in 2012, virtually all wild and captive bison in the United States are hybrids with cattle genes, with the exception of the two distinct breeding populations within Yellowstone National Park and their descendants. The cattle genes entered the bison population due to private ranchers hybridizing their bison to make them more docile, with some of these animals being accidentally reintroduced by the ABS. In response, in the fall of 2011, the WCS arranged for a herd of female bison originating from the American Prairie Reserve to be sent to the Colorado State University's Animal Reproduction & Biotechnology Laboratory to be used as surrogates in an attempt to transfer the fertilized embryos of genetically pure bison. After an ultrasound showed one female to be pregnant, the herd was moved to the zoo where, on June 20, 2012, the calf was born. The herd is kept in an off-exhibit section of the zoo and the goal is to eventually create a breeding herd of genetically pure bison through embryo transfers with the surrogate hybrid bison.

In 1981, the zoo successfully implanted a gaur embryo into a Holstein cow in an attempt to clone the endangered species.

In 1990, the zoo experienced a pest problem with the Canada goose. The park had become so over-crowded with the geese, that the zoo had to take action to decrease their numbers. Apart from their presence, the geese were very aggressive towards other birds and occasionally carried diseases into the park. To cope with the problem, the zoo hired a sharpshooter, who killed 19 geese. Zoo workers also destroyed 144 eggs found on the property. In 1991, the zoo employed a gentler method of sterilizing the birds.

In 2005, the zoo sent the frozen sperm of a male Indian rhinoceros to the Cincinnati Zoo where, four years later in 2009, it was thawed out and used in the first successful artificial insemination of the species when a calf was born in late 2010. The calf did not survive long-term.

In August 2006, the zoo adopted an orphaned snow leopard cub, named Leo. The 13-month-old cub was found stuck in mud following a landslide in Naltar Valley in Pakistan. The landslide had killed the cub's mother. A Pakistani shepherd in the area found the cub with its female sibling, but the female had died a week later due to malnutrition. He then handed over the male cub to Pakistani authorities to care for him. Since there are no captive breeding programs or rehabilitation centers for snow leopards in Pakistan, the authorities decided to send the cub to the Bronx Zoo. The cat will be returned to its place of birth following construction of a rehab facility in the Naltar Valley with cooperation from the United States. On April 9, 2013, Leo sired a cub. He was the first cub of Leo.

In 2007, the zoo successfully reintroduced three Chinese alligators into the wild. In July 2009, the zoo announced that the reintroduced alligators had begun breeding naturally in the wild, producing 15 hatchlings. The breeding was a milestone in the zoo's 10-year effort to reintroduce the species to the Yangtze River in China.

In January 2010, the zoo adopted four abandoned brown bear cubs. Three of the bears, two males and one female, were siblings born in 2009 and rescued from the ABC Islands in Alaska. The cubs were named Kootz, Denali, and Sitka. The fourth cub, a grizzly bear born in 2008, was rescued from Glacier National Park in Montana and named Glacier after the park. In 2015, two other rescued grizzly bears, who had been at the zoo since 1995, were sent to one of the zoo's partner institutions, the Central Park Zoo.

The next month, an "assurance colony" of Kihansi spray toads was placed in the zoo. The species disappeared in their native Tanzania home.

In February 2011, the zoo took in two bald eagles that were rescued in Wyoming. The 5-year-old male was found in 2008 and was believed to have been hit by a car. The 3-year-old female was believed to have been injured during a storm. The birds were taken in by the U.S. Fish and Wildlife Service and sent to the Woodford Cedar Run Wildlife Refuge in New Jersey for evaluation and care, where it was decided they were unable to survive in the wild.

In December 2012, five Chinese yellow-headed box turtles, a critically endangered species, were born.

In December 2015, the zoo rescued a juvenile Indian cobra which had stowed away on a cargo ship destined for New Jersey. The snake was found in poor condition being dehydrated, cold, and exposed to oil residue. The animal was brought to the zoo for recovery. It's unclear how the snake got onto the ship since it set out from Singapore, which is outside of the species' natural range.

Incidents and controversies

Human deaths
On July 29, 1985, two female Siberian tigers killed 24-year-old animal keeper Robin Silverman after she entered their enclosure with a volunteer aide. It was unclear why Silverman entered the enclosure; the zoo's general curator suspected a lapse in Silverman's concentration, while her family suspected a failure on the part of the zoo. It was the first fatality in the zoo's history.

Non-human deaths
In the early 2000s, the zoo added a troop of Javan langurs to JungleWorld and mixed them with oriental small-clawed otters. The otters had previously mixed with other primate species in the enclosure without any problems. However, the new langurs made a habit of constantly bothering and attacking the otters. In June 2007 a group of otters grabbed a langur that was sitting at the water's edge and proceeded to overpower, then drown it in full view of visitors. A keeper on the viewing deck attempted to break up the fight by whistling and yelling at the otters, to no avail. After killing the langur, the otters left the body floating in the pool. It was later removed by keepers. Part of the incident was recorded and uploaded to YouTube.

Soon after the incident, the otters were removed from the enclosure and given their own in the Children's Zoo and elsewhere in JungleWorld.

Safety incidents
In 2001, Peter Vitique, 32, climbed a 20-foot wall, entered the gorilla enclosure, and stripped down to his boxer shorts. He later told police that he wanted to be "one with the gorillas".

In 2004, a man stripped off his clothes in World of Darkness and jumped into the caiman enclosure. He was removed by zookeepers and police before he could sustain any injuries.

On July 9, 2008, the Skyfari, a now defunct gondola lift used to transport guests from the Zoo Center to Asia Plaza, broke down when high winds and heat caused one of the gondola cars to derail. A crane was brought into the zoo to evacuate the three guests in the derailed car, who were safely rescued after three hours. The car was then repaired and operations resumed, allowing the remaining passengers to exit normally. No serious injuries occurred as a result of the incident, although one couple sued. They claimed the "psychological trauma" of being stuck for five hours "above fang-baring, flesh-eating baboons" put the woman's pregnancy at risk. In January 2009, the zoo removed the Skyfari due to high maintenance costs.

During the 10 minutes that he was in the enclosure, Villalobos was alone with an 11-year-old male Amur tiger named Bashuta, a three-year resident of the zoo at the time, before being mauled. Villalobos was attacked on his shoulder, arms, legs, and back, before he was rescued by zoo officials who used fire extinguishers to chase the tiger away and told Villalobos to escape by rolling under a wire. Villalobos was taken to an area hospital and reported in stable condition. He had petted the 400-pound animal and wanted to be "one with the tiger". The tiger was not euthanized as a result of the incident, since it was clearly provoked, and the mauling did not result in a fatality.

In the summer of 2013, New Jersey residents Heung Ju Yi and Kyung Hee brought their 3-year-old son, Ethan, to the zoo to visit the popular Dinosaur Safari exhibit. After buying their tickets, each member of the family was given a free souvenir pressed penny as a gift promoting the exhibit. Soon afterward, Ethan swallowed the coin and began choking. His mother, Kyung, said she'd, "thought he'd died". Unsuccessful attempts to retrieve the coin from his throat were followed by rushing the boy to an emergency medical clinic, where X-rays showed it had entered his stomach. The next day, further X-rays revealed that the coin was not passing naturally, and surgery was required to remove it. Two days later, Ethan was put under general anesthesia, and the coin was removed via endoscopy. The surgery revealed that the zinc in the coin had reacted with his stomach acid and begun to dissolve, creating jagged edges that cut the inside of his stomach. The family, which did not have health insurance, were charged over $50,000 for this. In early 2014, the family pressed charges against the zoo and the Wildlife Conservation Society for unspecified damages. They claimed the zoo endangered their son since the employee who handed them the coins handed Ethan's directly to him and gave no warning about the choking hazards of small coins.

Animal escapes
In 1902, a 7-month-old male jaguar broke out of his cage and escaped.

In February 1995, the zoo's De Jur Aviary collapsed during a snowstorm with about 100 seabirds, including Inca terns and gulls, inside. During the collapse, some of the residents flew off and escaped. In total, about 30 birds were lost.

On March 26, 2011, the Bronx Zoo announced that World of Reptiles was closed after a venomous adolescent cobra was discovered missing from its off-exhibit enclosure on March 25. Zoo officials were confident the missing cobra would be found in the building and not outside, since the species is known to be uncomfortable in open areas. The missing snake quickly sparked a popular Twitter parody account, @BronxZoosCobra, which narrated the daily hijinks of the cobra. On March 31, zoo authorities found the snake in a non-public area of the reptile house.

On May 9, 2011, a female green peafowl escaped from the zoo before being caught on May 11.

On September 11, 2011, a lesser kudu escaped from its enclosure for about half an hour and then returned to its enclosure once a zoo worker opened the gate.

Happy the Elephant
In the early 1970s, seven Indian elephants, named after the Seven Dwarfs from Snow White, were captured as calves in Thailand and dispersed among multiple U.S. zoos and circuses. Two of those calves, named Grumpy and Happy, were brought to the zoo in 1977. Over the next 25 years, the pair lived together, separated from the zoo's other elephants. In July 2002, the zoo attempted to mix the pair with two females, Patty and Maxine. However, the introduction failed when Patty and Maxine attacked the pair and injured Grumpy. Over the next several months, the elephant's injuries worsened and, in October of that year, the zoo was forced to euthanize her. With her lifelong companion gone, Happy was paired with the zoo's younger female, Sammy, whose companion Tus had also died in 2002. The two got along very well until Sammy developed severe liver disease and was also euthanized in early 2006. This left Patty, Maxine, and Happy as the zoo's only remaining elephants.

Despite the fact that elephants are highly social animals, the zoo decided that making a second attempt at introducing Happy to the others was too risky, with there being too high a chance that she would be attacked. She has since lived without the company of other elephants. Due to this, the zoo has been criticized by multiple animal rights organizations for supposedly mistreating Happy. People for the Ethical Treatment of Animals (PETA) filed a formal complaint against the zoo with the Association of Zoos and Aquariums (AZA), calling for them to strip the zoo of its accreditation. In Defense of Animals (IDA) has named the zoo the "Hall of Shame Winner" on their 2015, 2016, and 2017 'Ten Worst Zoos for Elephants'. IDA listed the zoo fourth on their 2012 list, fifth on their 2013 and 2014 lists, and eighth on their 2009 list. The organizations, as well as many online petitions (some of which gain up to 200,000 supporters), have called on the zoo to send Happy to an elephant sanctuary. However, the zoo said that moving her at this stage in her life might be potentially traumatizing for her, and that she has very strong bonds with her keepers and is well-adjusted to the zoo, where she has spent well over thirty years of her life.

In 2012, a reporter for the New York Post wrote that she is kept inside all year and in solitary confinement. The zoo claims that she and the other two elephants have equal access to outdoor yards, and that the three elephants have limited interactions with each other and extensive interactions with zoo keepers. All three animals share the same barn, but Happy lives in separate stalls and yards. In late 2018, one of the zoo's other elephants, Maxine, was euthanized due to complications with her liver and kidneys.

A lawsuit against the Bronx Zoo, stating that Happy was legally "a person with a right to be free", was dismissed in February 2020 by a judge of the Bronx County Supreme Court. However, in May 2021, the New York Court of Appeals agreed to hear the appeal, filed on behalf of Happy by the Nonhuman Rights Project. In June 2022, the Court of Appeals also ruled in favor of the zoo, saying in a 5-2 decision that the writ of habeas corpus did not apply to nonhuman animals.

Ota Benga

In 1906, a major controversy erupted when Ota Benga, a Mbuti pygmy, was brought to the zoo by the American businessman and explorer Samuel Phillips Verner, and displayed there as an exhibit; though he was allowed to roam the grounds freely. He became fond of an orangutan named Dohong, "the presiding genius of the Monkey House", who had been taught to perform tricks and imitate human behavior. The events leading to his "exhibition" alongside Dohong were gradual. Benga spent some of his time in the Monkey House exhibit, where the zoo encouraged him to hang his hammock and to shoot his bow and arrow at a target. On the first day of the exhibit, September 8, 1906, visitors found Benga in the Monkey House. Soon, a sign on the exhibit read:

Hornaday considered the exhibit a valuable spectacle for visitors; he was supported by Madison Grant, secretary of the New York Zoological Society, who lobbied to put Benga on-display alongside apes at the zoo. A decade later, Grant became prominent nationally as a racial anthropologist and eugenicist.

African-American clergymen immediately protested to zoo officials about the exhibit. James H. Gordon said, "Our race, we think, is depressed enough, without exhibiting one of us with the apes ... We think we are worthy of being considered human beings, with souls." Gordon also thought the exhibit was hostile to Christianity and a promotion of Darwinism: "The Darwinian theory is absolutely opposed to Christianity, and a public demonstration in its favor should not be permitted." A number of clergymen backed Gordon. In defense of the depiction of Benga as a lesser human, an editorial in The New York Times suggested:

After the controversy, Benga was allowed to roam the grounds of the zoo. In response to the situation, as well as verbal and physical prods from the crowds, he became more mischievous and somewhat violent. Around this time, Rev. Dr. R. MacArthur of Calvary Baptist Church, was quoted in The New York Times saying: "It is too bad that there is not some society like the Society for the Prevention of Cruelty to Children. We send our missionaries to Africa to Christianize the people, and then we bring one here to brutalize him." Soon, the zoo removed Benga from the grounds. Benga committed suicide in 1916 at the age of 32. In 2020, WCS apologized for the zoo's treatment of Benga and promotion of eugenics.

The Most Dangerous Animal in the World
The Most Dangerous Animal in the World exhibit debuted at the Bronx Zoo on April 26, 1963. The exhibit was installed at the Great Apes House and it featured a statement about the danger humans pose.

The words: "The Most Dangerous Animal in the World" were printed in red on top of a cage. Behind the bars of the cage there was a mirror. The exhibit was reportedly still at the zoo in 1981.

Entrances (gates)
Asia Gate (walk in) Boston Road 
Bronx River Parkway Gate (parking)
Fordham Road Gate (parking)
Southern Boulevard Gate (parking)

In popular culture
In 2013, So What? Press published an issue of its comic series Tales of the Night Watchman, entitled "The Night Collector", about a coven of vampires that takes over the bat exhibit at the Bronx Zoo. A zookeeper who specializes in bats is put at odds with his co-worker when it's discovered that the woman of their mutual affection has been turned into a vampire. It was written by Dave Kelly and illustrated by Molly Ostertag.

In March 2016, Animal Planet announced plans to produce a docu-series about the zoo, titled The Zoo. The series premiered on February 18, 2017 and gained a second season in March 2018.

References

External links

Wildlife Conservation Society: Bronx Zoo
Bronx Park Postcards featuring historical postcards from the Bronx Zoo and The New York Botanical Garden
The Bronx Zoo forum
Bronx Zoo Photo Gallery & Walking Tour 
Bronx Zoo on zooinstitutes.com

Zoos in New York City
Parks in the Bronx
Entertainment venues in the Bronx
Fordham, Bronx
Astor Court
Tourist attractions in the Bronx
Wildlife Conservation Society
Zoos established in 1899
1899 establishments in New York City
Heins and LaFarge buildings
Beaux-Arts architecture in New York City
Bronx Park